Benjamin Vaughan Abbott (June 4, 1830 – February 17, 1890) was an American lawyer and author noted for his efforts in drawing up the New York penal code.

Early life 
On June 4, 1830, Abbott was born in Boston, Massachusetts. Abbott's father was Jacob Abbott, an author of children's books. Abbott's mother was Harriett Vaughan Abbott. Abbott's grandfather was also Jacob Abbott. Abbott's siblings are Edward Abbott, Austin Abbott and Lyman Abbott.

Education 
Abbott graduated from New York University in 1850, and Harvard Law School in 1852.

Career 
He practiced law for a number of years in New York, and became a partner in the firm Abbott Bros. with his brother Anthony Abbott. He was the secretary of the New York Code Commission, which drew up the state's penal code in 1864. He also served on a commission created to revise the statutes of the United States from 1870 to 1872. He died in Brooklyn, N.Y., on February 17, 1890.

He is the author of several books, including the following novels:
Come Cut Corners: The Experiences of a Conservative Family in Fanatical Times, 1855 (with Austin Abbott), and
Matthew Caraby (with brother, under the pseudonym Beanauly).

His non-fiction works include:
Abbott's Reports of Practice Cases in the Courts of the State of New York, 1855 (with Austin Abbott), 
Reports of cases in Admiralty, United States District Court for Southern New York, 1847–1850, 1857, 
A Collection of Forms of Practice and Pleading in Action, 1858, 
Digest of New York Statutes and Reports, 5 volumes, 1860, 
A Collector of Forms of Practice and Pleading in Actions, 1864, 
The Clerk's and Conveyancer's Assistant, 1866, 
Digest of the Reports of the United States Courts and Acts of Congress, 4 volumes, 1867, 
General Digest of the Law of Corporations, 1869, 
Digest of Reports of Indiana to the Year 1871, 
Reports of Decisions Rendered in the Circuit and District Courts of the United States, 1863–1871, 2 volumes, 1870–1871, 
United States Digest, 14 volumes, 1879, 
Dictionary of Terms and Phrases used in American or English Jurisprudence, 1879, 
General Digest of English and American Cases on the Law of Corporations, 1868–1878, 1879, 
National Digest, 4 volumes, 1884, containing court decisions of the year 1884, with a later supplement published in 1889, 
1884: The Patent Laws of All Nations, 2 volumes, 1886, and 
Decisions on the Law of Patents for Inventions, English Cases, 1662–1843, 3 volumes, 1887.

Personal life 
In 1853, Abbott married Elizabeth, daughter of John Titcomb. Abbott had two children. On February 17, 1890, Abbott died in Brooklyn, New York, U.S. Abbott is buried in Green-Wood Cemetery in Brooklyn.

References

Further reading 
Who Was Who in America: Historical Volume, 1607–1896, Chicago: Marquis Who's Who, 1967.

External links 
 
 
 
 Appleton's Cyclopedia of American Biography, edited by James Grant Wilson, John Fiske and Stanley L. Klos. Six volumes, New York: D. Appleton and Company, 1887–1889

1830 births
1890 deaths
Lawyers from Boston
Harvard Law School alumni
New York University alumni
Abbott family
Lawyers from New York City
19th-century American novelists
American legal writers
American male novelists
American male non-fiction writers